Romantica Y Calculadora is the 13th album by iconic Mexican singer Verónica Castro. It was released in 1992.

Track listing
 "Que Se Vaya A La Parranda" (Adolfo Angel Alba)
 "Amorcito Corazon" (Esperón Y Urdimalas)
 "Tu Me Vas A Llorar" (Adolfo Angel Alba)
 "Una Miradita" (Adolfo Angel Alba)
 "Peso Sobre Peso" (Chava Flors)
 "Vete De Mi" (Adolfo Angel Alba)
 "Era Chiquito" (Adolfo Angel Alba)
 "El Huerfanito"  (Cuco Sánchez)
 "Conocerte A Ti" (Adolfo Angel Alba)
 "A Que Le Tiras Cuando Sueñas Mexicano" (Chava Flores)

Singles

1992 albums
Verónica Castro albums